Pipe Dreams is a 1976 romantic drama film starring soul singer Gladys Knight in her acting debut as a woman who attempts to regain the love of her husband, played by real-life spouse Barry Hankerson. His boss is played by Wayne Tippit; Bruce French, Sally Kirkland and Altovise Davis (wife of Sammy Davis Jr.) round out the cast.

Plot
Maria Wilson follows her husband to Alaska, where he is working on the Alaska pipeline, to try to win him back. The local boss disapproves.

Cast
 Gladys Knight as Maria Wilson 
 Barry Hankerson as Rob Wilson 
 Wayne Tippit as Mike Thompson
 Sherry Bain as Loretta
 Bruce French as "The Duke"
 Sally Kirkland as Betty "Two Street Betty"
 Altovise Davis as Lydia
 Redmond Gleeson as "Hollow Legs"
 John Mitchum as Franklin

Production
The film was written and directed by Steve Verona and produced by Verona Enterprises and California Cinema Pruductions LGN, with financing from Buddah Records and minority organizations. Filming took place on location in Valdez in January 1976.

The soundtrack album for the movie was produced by Knight's brother Merald "Bubba" Knight.

Reception
Box office results were poor. Gladys Knight received a Golden Globe nomination for New Star Of The Year (Actress). "So Sad the Song" from Pipe Dreams, The Original Motion Picture Soundtrack earned a Golden Globe nomination for Best Original Song (Motion Picture).

Soundtrack

References

External links
 
 
 
 

1976 drama films
1976 films
Embassy Pictures films
1970s English-language films
American romantic drama films
1970s American films